Judoka-Secret Agent is a 1966  French-Italian Eurospy film written and directed by Pierre Zimmer. It is based on the short story Le Judoka dans le ville by Ernie Clark. It had a sequel in 1967, Casse-tête chinois pour le judoka, with a different cast except for  Marilù Tolo returning in a different role.

Plot

Cast  
 Jean-Claude Bercq as Marc Saint-Clair, aka The Judoka 
 Marilù Tolo as Vanessa
 Perrette Pradier as Dominique Berg
 Patricia Viterbo as Catherine Demange
 Michael Lonsdale as Thomas Perkins 
 Henri Garcin as Jacques Mercier
  Mick Besson  as Oscar Meyer 
  Fernand Berset as Commissioner Chaumont
  Yves Brainville as Paul Vincent

References

External links

1966 films
1960s spy thriller films
French spy thriller films
Italian spy thriller films  
1960s thriller films
Films directed by Pierre Zimmer
1960s French films
1960s Italian films
Judo films